Uznews.net was an independent Uzbek news website that operated from 2005 to 2014. As of 2010, it had been blocked by the Uzbek government for several years.

The website's editor-in-chief is Galima Bukharbaeva, an Uzbek journalist known for her eyewitness coverage of the 2005 Andijan massacre; she later won the International Press Freedom Award of the Committee to Protect Journalists.

Abdurahmanov stated that the drugs had been planted in retaliation for an uznews.net story he had recently published about alleged corruption of traffic police. He was found guilty and sentenced to ten years in prison in October 2008. The conviction drew protests from a number of Western-based human rights organizations, including Amnesty International (which named him a prisoner of conscience), Human Rights Watch, the Committee to Protect Journalists, the International Federation for Human Rights, and the Organization for Security and Co-operation in Europe.

As of December 20, 2014, the news site is shut down and all links redirect to the following message in Uzbek, Russian, and English:
Uznews.net has ceased to exist. 
We thank all our readers for having been with us and
a separate thank you to the most faithful who are logging in now. We are touched.

Uznews.net Team (January 2005 - December 2014)
A tribute article by Reporters Without Borders stated that the email of editor-in-chief Galima Bukharbayeva was hacked and confidential information identifying independent journalists who contributed to UzNews.net was leaked to the public. While all of the content has been taken down from the site, it is still accessible from the Internet Archive.

References

External links 

Mass media in Uzbekistan